Kalle Jürgenson (born 1 September 1960 in Tallinn) is an Estonian astrophysicist and politician. He was a member of VII, VIII and IX Riigikogu, and the Mayor of Elva from 1998 until 1999.

References

Living people
1960 births
Estonian astrophysicists
Isamaa politicians
Res Publica Party politicians
Members of the Riigikogu, 1992–1995
Members of the Riigikogu, 1995–1999
Members of the Riigikogu, 1999–2003
University of Tartu alumni
Politicians from Tallinn
20th-century Estonian people